The Priwall Peninsula (German: die Halbinsel Priwall or Der Priwall) is a spit located across from the town of Travemünde at the Trave River estuary, on Germany's Baltic Sea coast.   Since 1226 it has been administratively part of Travemünde, itself controlled by Lübeck.

The southern part has been designated a nature reserve (Naturschutzgebiet Südlicher Priwall). The Priwall is the eastern terminus of a bicycle path, opened in 1995, that begins at the Danish border at the town of Kruså. More famously, it is the northern terminus of the former inner German border, and a few remnants of the border fortifications have been preserved near the beach.

The Priwall's principal attraction is otherwise the four-masted barque Passat (now a museum ship) of the Flying P Line – which also included the four-masted barque Priwall.

The beaches of the Priwall at the Bay of Lübeck were the site of a former annual sand festival called Sand World.

See also
German language Wikipedia page for the Erprobungsstelle See/Travemünde on the Priwall Peninsula, one of the Luftwaffe aircraft test stations governed from Erprobungsstelle Rechlin during World War II.

External links

FRG–GDR border photos, 1964 and 1980s
Priwall Net

Peninsulas of Schleswig-Holstein
Lübeck
Spits of the Baltic Sea
Bay of Lübeck